The third season of The L Word originally aired on Showtime from January 8, 2006 to March 26, 2006 and aired 12 episodes. The season begins six months after the birth of Tina and Bette's daughter, Angelica. New characters in this season include Moira Sweeney (a working class butch portrayed by Daniel Sea who is Jenny's girlfriend for most of the season) and Angus Partridge (portrayed by Dallas Roberts), Angelica's male nanny who later becomes Kit's lover. Sweeney starts the process of transitioning switching his name to Max. Erin Daniels' character, Dana Fairbanks, starts in a multi-episode storyline dealing with a breast cancer battle and culminating with her death. Notable of this season is that each episode begins with a short pre-credits vignette of two individuals meeting romantically or sexually. As the season progresses, lines from Alice's chart (see here) connect one member of each vignette with a new individual in the next. Helena's character storyline was switched from being Bette's rival into a new member of the circle of friends. Her story arc for the season involves the acquisition of a movie studio in which Tina later works and which further derives a sexual harassment lawsuit that triggers her mother to cut her off financially in the season finale. Sarah Shahi's character, Carmen de la Pica Morales, ends her appearance in the show in the finale when Shane leaves her at the altar.

Cast and characters

Production
The producers of the series set up a contest at the website FanLib.com where fans could submit a femme slash fanfic. The winner's story was incorporated into a scene of a third-season episode.

Episodes

References

External links

The L Word
2006 American television seasons